The 2009–10 snooker season was a series of snooker tournaments played between 16 May 2009 and 8 May 2010. There were six ranking events, two less than in the previous season. The Bahrain Championship was not held again, and the Northern Ireland Trophy was removed from the calendar too. The Jiangsu Classic was held for the first time.

New professional players
Countries
 
 
 
 
 
 
 
 
 

Note: new means in these case, that these players were not on the 2008/2009 professional Main Tour. 

NGB nominations

From PIOS Tour 

WPBSA Wildcard

Calendar 
The following table outlines the results and dates for all the ranking and major invitational events.

Official rankings 

The top 16 of the world rankings, these players automatically played in the final rounds of the world ranking events and were invited for the Masters.

World ranking points

Points distribution 
2009/2010 Points distribution for world ranking events.

Notes

References

External links 

2009
Season 2010
Season 2009